Diaphus megalops is a species of lanternfish found in the Indo-west Pacific.

Size

Etymology
The fish's name means large eyes.

References

Myctophidae
Taxa named by Basil Nafpaktitis
Fish described in 1978